The Hudson Public Schools District is a coalition of public schools located in Hudson, Middlesex County, Massachusetts. The superintendent of Hudson Public Schools is Dr. Marco C. Rodrigues. The Hudson Public Schools' office is located at 155 Apsley Street in Hudson in the former Harriman Grammar School building.

Elementary Schools (grades K-4)
Camela A. Farley Elementary School is a public elementary school that serves grades K through 4. It was built in the 1950s and was named after long-time Hudson educator Camela A. Farley. The building has also served as the high school and the middle school. The principal is Melissa Provost and the Assistant Principal is Rachel Scanlon.
Joseph L. Mulready Elementary School is a public elementary school that serves grades K through 4. It was originally named the Cox Street School after the street it is located on, but was renamed after former Hudson superintendent Joseph L. Mulready. The principal is Kelly Costa Sardella.
Forest Avenue Elementary School is a public elementary school that serves grades K through 4. It was completed in 1975 and is named after Forest Avenue, the street it is located on. The principal is David Champigny and the assistant principal is Judith Merra.

Middle Schools (grades 5-7)
David J. Quinn Middle School is a middle school serving grades 5, 6 and 7. Quinn Middle School replaced John F. Kennedy Middle School, which was demolished over the summer in 2013. Quinn Middle School was ready by the first day of school for the class of 2013-14. The principal is Jeff Gaglione and the vice principal is Matt Gaffny.

High Schools (grades 8-12)

Hudson High School, or HHS, is a public high school that serves grades 8 through 12 (HHS also has preschool classes). The new multi-million-dollar building was finished in 2004, the same year the old building, which was built in the early 1970s, was demolished. The principal is Jason W. Medeiros and the assistant principals are Adam Goldberg, for upperclassmen, and Daniel McAnespie, for grades eight and nine.

Former Schools (in Chronological Order)

 The School Street Schoolhouse was built in 1854 and abandoned in 1925. It was located on School Street.
 The Old Broad Street School was built in 1867 and used until 1924. The New Broad Street School was built at the same site and was used until damaged by a fire. The new building, Cora Hubert Kindergarten Center replaced it at the same site.
 The Old Green Street School was built in 1878 and was located on Green Street. It was used until 1924, when it was demolished to make way for a private residence.
 The Felton Street School was built in 1882 and served as the town's high school until 1957. In 1986, the school was added to the National Register of Historic Places.
 The Harriman Grammar School was built sometime in the late 19th century, and is located on the corner of Lake and Apsley Streets. It not only served as a grammar school but early years was the high school. The building currently houses the administrative offices of the Hudson Public Schools District. It was named after Dr. James Lang Harriman (1833–1907), a 40-year-long Hudson physician and surgeon who also served on the Hudson School Committee for 38 years.
 The Linden Street School was built in 1924 to replace the Old Green Street School; this makes sense location-wise, as Linden Street is located off of Green Street. The Linden Street School building still exists today as a condominium complex.
 The Packard Street School was also built in 1924, and is located on Packard Street. The building housed the Hudson Police Department until the completion of their new headquarters in 2017.  The site is earmarked to be redeveloped for housing.
 The Cora Hubert Kindergarten Center was a kindergarten center that operated from 1992 to 2012, when the kindergarten closed permanently. Kindergartners now attend the elementary schools and the high school for classes. The former kindergarten is now left completely abandoned.
 The High Street Elementary School at 30 High Street that is now the Hudson Animal Hospital.

References

External links
Hudson Public Schools website
Hudson Public Schools profile on Massachusetts Dept. of Education website
Hudson High School website
Quinn Middle School website
C.A. Farley Elementary School website
Forest Avenue Elementary School website
J.L. Mulready Elementary School website

School districts in Massachusetts
Education in Middlesex County, Massachusetts
Hudson, Massachusetts